Jason Lawrence Olive  (born February 10, 1972) is an American actor. He is best known for his role as Joseph in the sitcom Tyler Perry's For Better or Worse.

Early years
He attended the University of Hawaii on full athletic and academic scholarship. At the age of 17, he played his first professional volleyball tournament.

Olive is African-American, Irish, German and Chippewa (Ojibwe).

Career
He had previously roles in many television series and movies including All My Children, BET's The Game, romantic comedy film Raising Helen, and others. In a dispute over the use of his photo in advertising for longer than allowed by his contract, Olive obtained a $1,133,000 judgment against General Nutrition Corporation, Inc. The judgement was affirmed on appeal in December 2018.

Filmography

References

External links
 

Living people
American male television actors
1972 births